The Sleeping Soul is an independent supernatural horror film written and directed by film writer and producer Shawn Burkett. The story centers on Grace (Ayse Howard) as she is haunted after the traumatic death of her husband (Corey A. Thrush). The film was released in March 2012.

Plot 

The Official Site (taken down after the premiere) listed this as the plot summary:

The Sleeping Soul is a story about a woman "Grace" who has lost her
fiance & unborn son to a drunk driving accident.

Almost a year after the accident Grace is beginning to recover
from the tragedy, until her vivid nightmares & paranormal occurrences
begin to push her to the edge. The line between sane & insane begins
to blur as the days grow closer to the one year anniversary.

The adds more details. The trailer begins with her sitting at her computer, filming a video diary, with smudged makeup and a somber face. She begins, choked up, "It is the one-year anniversary of when my fiancee died." A ghost (assumed to be her husband's spirit) torments her in between her next video diary, moving things eerily while she is in the shower. In the next video diary she says "It's constantly toying with me...I don't know how much more I can take." We see her recklessly taking pills and drinking in an obvious downward spiral. The trailer ends with an unexplained startling noise apparently brought on by her dead fiancee.

Cast 
 Ayse Howard as Grace James
 Corey A. Thrush as Cover Masterson
 Scott Gillespie as Drunk Driver
 Elizabeth Bright as Taylor Masterson 
 Conor Elwood Burkett as Young Conor Masterson
 Luke Burnett as Conor Masterson

Reception 
Horror Society rated The Sleeping Soul 3/5 stars, and Bloody Disgusting rated it 0.5/5 stars.

Background 
The Sleeping Soul was based on a short story Shawn Burkett wrote in late 2010.
He later started a small independent film company and began shooting films. This was his second. The Sleeping Soul was filmed in January 2012, and premiered on March 3, 2012.

Accolades 
The Sleeping Soul was an official selection of the 2012 Fright Night Film Fest, a horror convention located in Louisville, Kentucky.

See also 
 List of ghost films
 Psychological horror

Notes

References

External links
 Official Site (page at Concept Media Films)
 

2012 films
American ghost films
American horror thriller films
American independent films
American supernatural horror films
American supernatural thriller films
2010s English-language films
2010s American films